Thomas Brady may refer to:

Government
Thomas Brady (general) (1752–1827), Irish general in the Austrian army
Thomas Brady (mayor) (1850–1928), American politician
Thomas "Bud" Brady (1938–2011), member of the Louisiana House of Representatives
Thomas J. Brady (1839–1904), American Civil War general and Second Assistant Postmaster General
Thomas Pickens Brady (1903–1973), segregationist and justice on the Mississippi Supreme Court

Sports
Thomas Brady (canoeist) (born 1991), British slalom canoeist
Tom Brady (born 1977), American football quarterback
Tom Brady (rugby union) (born 1991), English rugby union player
Tom Brady (Australian footballer) (1892–1945), Australian rules footballer

Others
Tom Brady (film director), American director, writer and producer

See also
Tomás Brady (born 1987), Gaelic footballer and hurler 
Tom Bradley (disambiguation)